HD 73634 is a single star in the southern constellation of Vela. It has the Bayer designation e Velorum; HD 73634 is the star's designation from the Henry Draper Catalogue. The star is white in hue and is faintly visible to the naked eye, having an apparent visual magnitude of +4.11. Parallax measurements provide a distance estimate of approximately 1,800 light years from the Sun. It is drifting further away with a radial velocity of +19 km/s.

This evolved object has received stellar classifications of A7Ia and A6II, indicating that it is a massive supergiant or bright giant star. It has 7.8 times the mass of the Sun and is around 40 million years old. The star has expanded to nearly 34 times the girth of the Sun and is radiating around 4,140 times the Sun's luminosity from its enlarged photosphere at an effective temperature of 7,977 K.

References

A-type bright giants
A-type supergiants
Vela (constellation)
Velorum, e
Durchmusterung objects
073634
042312
3426